Ibtihaj Muhammad (born December 4, 1985) is an American sabre fencer and member of the United States fencing team. She is known for being the first Muslim American woman to wear a headscarf while competing for the United States in the Olympics, as well as for winning an Olympic medal (bronze) wearing it.

Early life
Ibtihaj Muhammad was born and raised in Maplewood, New Jersey, a suburb 25 miles (40 km) from Manhattan, and is of African American descent. Her parents were born in the United States, and converted to Islam. Her father, Eugene Muhammad, is a retired Newark, New Jersey police officer, and her mother, Denise, was an elementary school special education teacher. She is the third child of five siblings.

In accordance with their Islamic beliefs, Ibtihaj's parents sought out a sport for her to participate in where she could maintain her hijab.

Ibtihaj attended Columbia High School, a public high school in Maplewood, graduating in 2003. She attended Duke University and graduated in 2007 with dual bachelor's degrees in international relations and African and African-American studies.

According to The Telegraph, Ibtihaj Muhammad started to wear the hijab at a very young age. When growing up and pursuing a career in fencing, she thought keeping her hijab would inspire women and young girls around the world to break boundaries and pursue their desires even while wearing the hijab.

Fencing career
At Columbia High School, she joined the school fencing team at age 13. Her former coach Frank Mustilli had her switch weapons, from épée to sabre.

In late 2002, Ibtihaj joined the prestigious Peter Westbrook Foundation, a program which utilizes the sport of fencing as a vehicle to develop life skills in young people from underserved communities. She was invited to train under the Westbrook Foundation's Elite Athlete Program in New York City.

Ibtihaj attended Duke University on a scholarship. She was a 3-time All-American and the 2005 Junior Olympic Champion. Ibtihaj graduated from Duke University in 2007 with an International Relations and African American Studies double major.

Ibtihaj has been a member of the United States National Fencing Team since 2010. She, as of 2017, ranks No. 2 in the United States and No. 7 in the world. She is a 5-time Senior World medalist, including 2014 World Champion in the team event.

2016 Summer Olympics
Ibtihaj was defeated by Cécilia Berder of France in the second round in the Women's Individual Sabre in the Rio de Janeiro 2016 Summer Olympics but still left Rio with a bronze medal. Despite the loss, she attracted significant media attention.

She is best known for being the first woman to wear a hijab while competing for the United States in the Olympics.

Ibtihaj became the first female Muslim-American athlete to earn a medal at the Olympics. She earned a bronze medal in the Team Sabre, by defeating Italy 45–30 in the medal match. This came after defeating Poland 45–43, and losing to Russia 42–45.

As symbol of America's diversity and tolerance
The 2016 Summer Olympics occurred during the U.S. Presidential campaign in which questions of Muslim assimilation were being discussed, including with respect to U.S.-born Muslims. Ibtihaj as visibly Muslim (due to her hijab) became "one of the best symbols against intolerance America can ever have", according to The Guardian. However, Ibtihaj drew some criticism during the Olympics by describing the United States as a dangerous place for Muslims, saying that she did "not feel safe" as a Muslim living in America.

Other activities
As a child, noticed all her dolls looked nothing like her as she started to wear the hijab at a very young age. She was then inspired to cut pieces of cloth and fabrics to make little hijabs and wrap them around her dolls.

In 2014, Ibtihaj and her siblings launched their own clothing company, Louella, which aims to bring modest fashionable clothing to the United States market. She is also a sports ambassador, serving on the U.S. Department of State’s Empowering Women and Girls Through Sport Initiative. She has traveled to various countries to engage in dialogue on the importance of sports and education.

In 2017, as part of its International Women's Day campaign, Mattel introduced a line of female role model Barbies, including one  in a Hijab; and Barbie's first doll fencer, which is designed after Ibtihaj. Through the creation of a hijabi Barbie, it reinforced her belief that young girls and boys should see themselves through these toys while valuing inclusiveness and diversity.

Bibliography
She has also penned two books about her life growing up in New Jersey and her Olympic experience:

 Muhammad, Ibtihaj. (2018) Proud: My Fight for an Unlikely American Dream. New York: Hachette Books. 
 Muhammad, Ibtihaj. (2018) (Young Readers Edition) Proud: Living My American Dream. New York: Little, Brown and Company. 
 Muhammad, Ibtihaj. (2018) The Proudest Blue: A Story of Hijab and Family. New York: Little, Brown and Company.

See also 
 Muslim women in sport
List of USFA Division I National Champions

References

External links

 
 
 
 

1985 births
Living people
African-American Muslims
African-American sportswomen
American Muslims
American female sabre fencers
Columbia High School (New Jersey) alumni
Duke University alumni
Fencers at the 2011 Pan American Games
Muslim fashion designers
People from Maplewood, New Jersey
Fencers at the 2012 Summer Olympics
Fencers at the 2016 Summer Olympics
Sportspeople from Essex County, New Jersey
Medalists at the 2016 Summer Olympics
Olympic bronze medalists for the United States in fencing
Pan American Games medalists in fencing
Pan American Games gold medalists for the United States
Medalists at the 2011 Pan American Games
21st-century African-American sportspeople
21st-century African-American women
20th-century African-American people
20th-century African-American women
Fencers at the 2015 Pan American Games
American women fashion designers
American fashion designers
African-American fashion designers